The Order of the Stones (L'Ordre des Pierres) is volume twenty in the French comic book (or bande dessinée) science fiction series Valérian and Laureline created by writer Pierre Christin and artist Jean-Claude Mézières. It continues the story begun in At the Edge of the Great Void. It was released in January 2007.

Plot
Commander Singh'a Rough'a takes her ship to the Great Void. There, she and eight members of her crew, including Valérian and Laureline, go on a small landing craft to explore the Void.

The craft lands on a small planetoid, where the crew first encounters the Wolochs. They are soon confronted by the Rubanis triumvirate: Colonel Tloc, Na-Zultra and S'Traks. The triumvirate is intent on doing their utmost to stop them from reaching their goal, so a fight is about to ensue. However, one of the Wolochs falls down and crushes four of Singh'a Rough'a's crew, killing them. The triumvirate departs, with Tloc pointing out another Woloch crushing Singh'a' Rough'a's landing craft.

Left stranded on an empty planet, the crew's only hope of survival is Laureline's Tchoung, which she sends to contact their mothership. Meanwhile, the triumvirate meets with their mysterious guide again, who tells them more of the Wolochs' plans.

Safely back on board their ship, Singh'a Rough'a's crew continues their exploration of the Great Void. At the same time, the triumvirate is already planning their revenge against them. Colonel Tloc releases a rumour that Valérian and Laureline are looking for the Time Opener. As Singh'a Rough'a and her crew continue their searches, Ky-Gaï and her Schniarfeur go to explore the Great Void on their own.

In the Great Void, Singh'a Rough'a's crew has finally found a place rich in resources, but as they are returning, they are met by the triumvirate and the Wolochs, who start a fight with them. The Wolochs almost entirely obliterate Singh'a Rough'a's ship, leaving only a small escape craft with only Valérian, Laureline, and Doctor Chal' Darouine on board. The escape craft crash lands on a sticky "cheese moon", where they are reunited with Ky-Gaï and her Schniarfeur. Ky-Gaï salvages their craft and takes it into her own craft's tow. Then they can continue their exploration of the Great Void.

External links
 Dargaud's site which contains a coverpicture and also a five page preview
 BD Gest's site have previews of the coverpicture and the first eight pages of the new album

2007 graphic novels
Valérian and Laureline